The Hunter Pirates are a defunct Australian professional men's basketball team that competed in the National Basketball League (NBL). It was based in the city of Newcastle, New South Wales.

Team history
The team was once known as the Canberra Cannons, one of the foundation members of the NBL (the others were the Newcastle Falcons, Illawarra Hawks and Brisbane Bullets). At the end of the 2002–03 season, new owners moved the team to Newcastle and renamed the franchise the Hunter Pirates, keeping with the maritime battlers theme. The Pirates new home arena was the 4,658 seat Newcastle Entertainment Centre.

In its first season, 2003–04, the team came last, winning only two games. Initial coach Bruce Palmer was controversially fired partway into the season and was replaced by assistant coach David Simmons.

In 2004–05, former Perth Wildcats, Australian Boomers and Australian Institute of Sport coach Dr. Adrian Hurley was employed as the head coach. A mostly-retooled team produced much better results, finishing 8th with a 15–17 record. The Pirates made the NBL Playoffs, only to be eliminated by the Brisbane Bullets in the opening round.

Adrian Hurley quit at the end of the 2005–06 season after the Hunter Pirates were beaten by the Cairns Taipans in the playoffs.

The club did have plans in the next few years to move from the Entertainment Centre to a new stadium to be built at the Stockland Supercentre out at Glendale, a suburb of Newcastle but this never eventuated.

The Pirates withdrew from the NBL competition at the end of the 2005/06 season due to financial difficulties and their inability to secure a major sponsor, and the club's NBL licence was put up for sale. It was revealed on NBN News that, in an effort to remain in the competition, the club had considered turning itself into a not-for-profit organisation, thereby able to access various grants.

In the end, the Pirates' licence was sold to a Singapore consortium, and the Singapore Slingers began competing in the 2006–07 season.

Honour Roll

Source: www.nbl.com.au

Season by season

References

External links 
 

2003 establishments in Australia
2006 disestablishments in Australia 
Basketball teams established in 2003
Basketball teams disestablished in 2006
Basketball teams in New South Wales
Defunct National Basketball League (Australia) teams
Sport in Newcastle, New South Wales